Peter Carr may refer to:

 Peter Carr (New Zealand politician) (1884–1946), New Zealand member of parliament
 Peter Carr (footballer) (born 1951), English soccer player
 Peter Carr (Virginia politician) (1770–1815), Virginia politician
 Peter Carr (public servant) (1930–2017), British public servant
 Peter P. Carr (1890–1966), American grocer and Wisconsin state senator
 Pete Carr (born 1950), American guitarist
 Peter Carr (speedway rider) (born 1963), English speedway rider

See also
 Peter Kerr (disambiguation)